Kirovske may refer to: 
 Kirovske, Donetsk Oblast, a city in Donetsk Oblast, Ukraine
 Kirovske, Crimea, a town in Crimea, Ukraine
 Kirovske Raion, a raion (district) of Crimea, Ukraine

See also
 Kirovsk (disambiguation)